Space colony may refer to:

 Space colonization, any colony outside the planet Earth
 Space habitat, a free-floating extraterrestrial habitat labeled colony specifically

Fiction
 Space Colony (video game), a real-time strategy video game.
 Colony in Space, a season 8 serial from Doctor Who